The Baynham House is a historic house on Stephens Street in Success, Arkansas.  It is a two-story wood-frame structure with a hip-and-gable roof, and a porch extending across the width of the front.  It was built in 1911 by J. W. Baynham, a local lumber merchant, and is one of the few buildings in the community to survive from its heyday as a lumber town in the early 20th century.

The house was listed on the National Register of Historic Places in 1978.

See also
National Register of Historic Places listings in Clay County, Arkansas

References

Houses on the National Register of Historic Places in Arkansas
Houses completed in 1911
Houses in Clay County, Arkansas
National Register of Historic Places in Clay County, Arkansas